Rimi is a Local Government Area in Katsina State, Nigeria. Its headquarters are in the town of Rimi, near the A9 highway.

It has an area of 452 km and a population of 153,744 at the 2006 census.
 
The postal code of the area is 822.

References

Local Government Areas in Katsina State